Synuchus patroboides is a species of ground beetle in the subfamily Harpalinae. It was described by Carl H. Lindroth in 1956.

References

Synuchus
Beetles described in 1956